Irina Vladimirovna Pershina (September 13, 1978 in Kropotkin, Krasnodar Krai, USSR) is a Russian Synchro-swimmer.

She has Olympic gold medals in team competition in 2000 and won two European Championships (1999, 2000).

She was a member of National team since 1997,Now She Is TV Presenter Of Channel One.

External links
 Irina Pershina's profile 

Russian synchronized swimmers
Olympic synchronized swimmers of Russia
Synchronized swimmers at the 2000 Summer Olympics
Olympic gold medalists for Russia
1978 births
Living people
People from Kropotkin, Krasnodar Krai
Olympic medalists in synchronized swimming
Medalists at the 2000 Summer Olympics
Sportspeople from Krasnodar Krai